Karintamil is thought to be the earliest predecessor of the modern Malayalam language. The Sangam literature can be considered as the ancient predecessor of Malayalam.

The earliest records in Karintamil are the pattu literature (songs). Prominent were songs praising the goddesses of the land, ballads of brave warriors, songs related to the work of a particular caste and songs intended just for entertainment, including compositions by Kulasekhara Alvar (9th century CE) and Pakkanar.

Notes

Further reading
 
 
 

Malayalam language